Borisoglebka is a rural locality (a selo) and the administrative center of Borisoglebsky Selsoviet of Oktyabrsky District, Amur Oblast, Russia. The population was 197 as of 2018. There are 5 streets.

Geography 
Borisoglebka is located on the right bank of the Dim River, 59 km southwest of Yekaterinoslavka (the district's administrative centre) by road. Ilyinovka is the nearest rural locality.

References 

Rural localities in Oktyabrsky District, Amur Oblast